Charles Goodnight (March 5, 1836 – December 12, 1929), also known as Charlie Goodnight, was a rancher in the American West. In 1955, he was inducted into the Hall of Great Westerners of the National Cowboy & Western Heritage Museum.

Early years

Goodnight was born in Macoupin County, Illinois, northeast of St. Louis, the fourth child of Charles Goodnight and the former Charlotte Collier. Goodnight's father's grave is located in a pasture south of Bunker Hill, Illinois. Goodnight was descended from immigrant pioneer Hans Michael Gutknecht, from Mannheim, Germany, making him a distant relative of Harry S Truman.

Goodnight moved to Texas in 1846 with his mother and stepfather, Hiram Daugherty. In 1856, he became a cowboy and served with the local militia, fighting against Comanche raiders. A year later, in 1857, Goodnight joined the Texas Rangers. Goodnight is also known for raising and leading a posse against the Comanche in 1860 that located the Indian camp where Cynthia Ann Parker was living with her husband, Peta Nocona, then guiding Texas Rangers to the camp, leading to Cynthia Ann's recapture. He later made a treaty with her son, Quanah Parker.

At the outbreak of the Civil War, he joined the Confederate States Army. Most of his time was spent as part of a frontier regiment guarding against raids by Indians.

Goodnight described what it took to become a scout, "First, he must be born a natural woodsman and have the faculty of never needing a compass except in snow storms or darkness."

Cattle 

Following the war, he became involved in the herding of feral Texas Longhorn cattle northward from West Texas to railroads. This "making the gather" was a near-statewide round-up of cattle that had roamed free during the four long years of war. In 1866, Oliver Loving and he drove their first herd of cattle along what would become known as the Goodnight-Loving Trail. Gathering their herd near the headwaters of the Brazos River, they headed southwest, crossed the Pecos River at Horsehead Crossing and then followed the river north into New Mexico to Ft. Sumner where they sold their herd to the Army.  Such a circuitous route was necessary to avoid the Comanche stronghold in the Staked Plains (the sizeable area roughly centered around present day Lubbock, Texas).  Later in the partnership with Loving, as they extended the trail northward they pastured cattle at such sites as Capulin Mountain in northeastern New Mexico. Goodnight invented the chuckwagon, which was first used on the initial cattle drive. Upon arriving in New Mexico, they formed a partnership with New Mexico cattleman John Chisum for future contracts to supply the United States Army with cattle. After Loving's death, Goodnight and Chisum extended the trail from New Mexico to Colorado, and eventually to Wyoming. The Goodnight-Loving Trail extended from Belknap, Texas, to Fort Sumner, New Mexico.

Goodnight and Loving were close friends. Goodnight sat by Loving's bed during the two weeks the latter took to die, and reportedly kept a photograph of Loving in his pocket long after his death, and later put a photograph on his desk.

To take advantage of available grass, timber, water, and game, Goodnight founded in 1876 what was to become the first Texas Panhandle ranch, the JA Ranch, in the Palo Duro Canyon.

Bison

In addition to raising cattle 1876, the Goodnights preserved a herd of native plains bison that year, which is said to survive to this day in Caprock Canyons State Park. The herd in Caprock Canyons was actually donated in name by JA Ranch, which Goodnight managed for years. Bison of this herd were introduced into the Yellowstone National Park in 1902 and into the larger zoos and ranches throughout the nation. He also crossbred the bison with domestic cattle, which he called cattalo.

Personal life

On July 26, 1870, Goodnight married Mary Ann "Molly" Dyer, a teacher from Weatherford, west of Fort Worth. Goodnight developed a practical sidesaddle for Molly.

After Molly died in April 1926, Goodnight became ill himself. He was nursed back to health by a distant paternal cousin, 26-year-old nurse and telegraph operator from Butte, Montana, named Corinne Goodnight, with whom Charles had been corresponding because of their shared surname. On March 5, 1927, his 91st birthday, Goodnight married Corinne, who was young enough to be his great-granddaughter and who soon miscarried their unborn child. Her name was hence Corinne Goodnight Goodnight. He joined her Two by Twos church and was baptized a few months before his death in his winter home in Phoenix, Arizona. Evetts Haley had described Goodnight as "deeply religious and reverential by nature." He is buried next to his first wife, Mary Ann, in the Goodnight Cemetery near Amarillo.

Goodnight Ranch House restoration 

The Charles and Mary Ann (Molly) Goodnight Ranch House is listed on the National Register of Historic Places. The home was renovated by the Armstrong County Museum from 2006 to 2012. The structure was painted to resemble its appearance in 1887. The interior was restored based on research into the original paint and wallpapers used. Mary Ann Goodnight taught children in the bunkhouse. The cowboys slept there at night, and she moved their things aside for school during the day, Goodin said.

The house was scheduled to open in April 2013.

Reputation
Goodnight is  presented as a good and decent man. J. Frank Dobie, who knew Goodnight, is quoted in Charles Goodnight: Father of the Texas Panhandle as having said: "I have met a lot of good men, several fine gentlemen, hordes of cunning climbers, plenty of loud-braying asses and plenty of dumb oxen, but I haven't lived long enough or traveled far enough to meet more than two or three men I'd call great. This is a word I will not bandy around. To me, Charles Goodnight was great-natured."

Other views have been expressed. In Time-Life's 1973 publication The Cowboys, the author states (p. 62): "Goodnight was no better than the rest. Once when his wife expressed shock at some vigilante hangings ('I understand', she exclaimed, 'they hanged them to a telegraph pole!') Charlie replied quietly, 'Well, I don't think it hurt the telegraph pole.' What she didn't know was that the victims had actually been strung up with Goodnight's full approval." The men hanged were caught in the act of murder and cattle rustling.

In literature

The western novelist Matt Braun's novel Texas Empire is based on the life of Goodnight and fictionalizes the founding of the JA Ranch. The Goodnight Trail is the name of a novel by Ralph Compton. Similarly, Mari Sandoz's Old Jules Country in the part "Some dedicated men" relates the difficulties of Goodnight's cattle drives to Colorado. In James A. Michener's novel, Centennial, the Skimmerhorn Trail is based on the actual Goodnight-Loving Trail. In addition, his name is mentioned in the novel; the character R. J. Poteet appears to have been based on Goodnight.
 
All four of Larry McMurtry's Lonesome Dove series novels include brief appearances by Goodnight. His appearance in the prequel Dead Man's Walk is historically inaccurate. The story takes place during the Santa Fe Expedition of 1841, when Goodnight would have been only five years old. Further, Lonesome Dove is a fictionalized account of Goodnight and Loving's third cattle drive. Woodrow F. Call represents Goodnight, Augustus McCrae is Oliver Loving. Though the characters have personalities rather different from their real-life counterparts, the novel borrows heavily from actual events, in particular Loving's ambush by Indians and Goodnight's attentive care as Loving died from an arrow-induced infection. Call returns McCrae's body to Texas, just as Goodnight returned Loving for burial in Weatherford. The marker that Call carves for Deets is based on an epitaph Charles Goodnight created for Bose Ikard, an ex-slave who worked alongside Goodnight most of his life. He also plays his largest role in the final volume, Streets of Laredo. He is played in the miniseries  Dead Man's Walk by Chris Penn, in Comanche Moon by Jeremy Ratchford, and in Streets of Laredo by James Gammon.

In popular culture

The song "The Goodnight-Loving Trail" by Utah Phillips describes a chuckwagon cook on a cattle drive.

The West Texas songwriter Andy Wilkinson wrote "Charlie Goodnight: His Life in Poetry and Song". The CD was produced by Lloyd Maines of Lubbock.

Albertan Ian Tyson of Alberta, Canada, wrote a song "Charles Goodnight's Grave", about leaving bandannas near the Goodnight grave.

Singer Guy Clark's song about Texas, "Red River", includes the line "Here's to Charlie Goodnight, and Mr. Loving too, and here's to Coronado, the Comanche and the Blues, and here's to the bootleggers, and the oilfield crews, and here's to one and all of us Red River fools."

The actor Jack Mather played Goodnight in the episode "Old Blue" of the syndicated television anthology series, Death Valley Days, hosted by Stanley Andrews. The episode focuses on Goodnight's lead steer, Old Blue, who is stolen and thereafter adopted as a family pet.

Goodnight's name was mentioned in the episode "The Brother-in-Law" of the television series The Rifleman (initially aired in October 1958 as episode five of the show's first season).

Actor Chris Penn played Goodnight in the Dead Man's Walk (miniseries).

Actor/producer Taylor Sheridan played Goodnight in Season 1, Episode 7 (“Lightning Yellow Hair”) and Episode 8 (“The Weep of Surrender”) of the television show 1883.

Namesakes

The following are named for Goodnight:

 Charles Goodnight Memorial Trail
 Former town of Goodnight (now a ghost town) in Armstrong County, site of the former Goodnight Baptist College, and birthplace in 1920 of scientist Cullen M. Crain 
 The highway to Palo Duro Canyon State Park east of Canyon, Texas
 Goodnight Elementary School, Pueblo, Colorado
 Goodnight Middle School, San Marcos, Texas
 A street in Pueblo, Colorado
 A cabin at YMCA Camp Carter in Fort Worth, Texas
 A street in Mansfield, Texas, off of Debbie Lane
 A street in Alto, New Mexico, outside Ruidoso, is named the Goodnight-Loving Trail.
 A street in Justin, Texas, off F.M. 407 (Goodnight Trail), part of Fort Worth, is located near the Texas Motor Speedway.  Part of the subdivision Reatta Ridge also has names such as Loving, Chinos, and Lone Star within the subdivision.

Goodnight

See also
 Fort Sumner, New Mexico

References

Further reading
Charles Goodnight: Cowman and Plainsman, by J. Evetts Haley, with illustrations by Harold Dow Bugbee
Charles Goodnight: Father of the Texas Panhandle, by William T. Hagan 
Texas Ranchmen, by Dorothy Abbott McCoy
The New Handbook of Texas, Texas State Historical Association
Family History, by Mark Tracy Sheek
JA Ranch Records, Southwest Collection/Special Collections Library, Texas Tech University at Lubbock, Texas

External links
 Charles Goodnight Historical Center
 PBS-WETA: New Perspectives on the West – Charles Goodnight
 Legends of America- Charles Goodnight
 

1836 births
Northern-born Confederates
1929 deaths
Cowboys
American cattlemen
American pioneers
Ranchers from Texas
Members of the Texas Ranger Division
People of the American Old West
People from Macoupin County, Illinois
People from Pueblo, Colorado
People from Amarillo, Texas
People from Clarendon, Texas
Agricultural buildings and structures on the National Register of Historic Places in Texas
Houses on the National Register of Historic Places in Texas
Confederate States Army soldiers
American Pentecostals
National Register of Historic Places in Randall County, Texas
People from Armstrong County, Texas